The Deputy Chief Cabinet Secretary assists the Chief Cabinet Secretary in the government of Japan.

Officeholders

2000-03 

 Shinzo Abe

2006-07 

 Hakubun Shimomura (First Abe Cabinet)

2012-14 

 Katsunobu Katō

2021 to present 
 Seiji Kihara
 Yoshihiko Isozaki
 Shun'ichi Kuryu

References 

Cabinet Office (Japan)
Japanese government officials
1947 establishments in Japan